Robert I. Blau (born 1955) is an American Career Foreign Service Officer who served as Chargé d'Affaires ad interim to El Salvador from January 2009 until September 2010.

There was an issue during his tenure about the United States interfering with El Salvador elections which Blau needed to be involved with.

References

External links
Special Update: U.S. Embassy Cables from San Salvador Released by WikiLeaks
EL SALVADOR’S REMARKABLE TRANSITION

1955 births
Living people
21st-century American diplomats
Date of birth missing (living people)
Place of birth missing (living people)
United States Foreign Service personnel
Ambassadors of the United States to El Salvador